Plutonik formed in 1999 in Birmingham, England. Comprising Chrissy Van Dyke (vocals, guitar), Alan Rowe (guitar, keyboards and programming) and James D (Rhodes piano).

Having signed to Integrity Records, Plutonik released two singles, "Sitting on Top of the World" and "Londinium", both of which received airplay on national radio from DJs such as Steve Lamacq on BBC Radio 1, and their debut album Prime Numbers, which was described by The Observer as "real quality".

The band toured extensively in the UK and mainland Europe with an expanded five-piece lineup and were one of the first drum-and-bass acts to utilise a live drummer.

Over 10 years after its release, Prime Numbers was reissued by Integrity Records in the autumn of 2012 and made available for digital download for the first time.

References

Musical groups from Birmingham, West Midlands